Long Creek is a village in Macon County, Illinois, United States. As of the 2020 census its 1,261. It is included in the Decatur, Illinois Metropolitan Statistical Area.

History
Long Creek is named for the creek that runs through the area.

The first settlers arrived in 1828 from North Carolina and subsequently built log cabins and made improvements on the surrounding land. In the fall of 1828, a band of Native Americans from the Kickapoo Tribe of Oklahoma arrived and set up camp along Long Creek and began trapping, hunting, and fishing. When they were relatively unsuccessful at catching game, the Kickapoo began killing hogs and stealing poultry from the early settlers. Eventually a group of settlers drove them from the county.

During the early 1830s the area saw more settlers arriving, and the first schoolhouse was constructed in 1834. The school also served as a place of worship before the first church was built in 1842.

Geography
Long Creek is located in eastern Macon County at  (39.808936, -88.856548). It is bordered to the northwest by the city of Decatur, the county seat, and to the southwest by the village of Mount Zion. U.S. Route 36 runs along the northern edge of Long Creek village, leading northwest  to the center of Decatur and east  to Tuscola.

Long Creek flows through the center of the village limits, running west to Finley Creek at the southeast arm of Lake Decatur, a reservoir on the Sangamon River.

Demographics

As of the census of 2000, there were 1,364 people, 486 households, and 408 families residing in the village. The racial makeup of the village was 98.61% White, 0.44% African American, 0.15% Native American, 0.29% Asian, 0.07% from other races, and 0.44% from two or more races. Hispanic or Latino people of any race were 0.51% of the population.

There were 486 households, out of which 38.5% had children under the age of 18 living with them, 74.1% were married couples living together, 5.6% had a female householder with no husband present, and 16.0% were non-families. 13.8% of all households were made up of individuals, and 6.6% had someone living alone who was 65 years of age or older. The average household size was 2.81 and the average family size was 3.08.

In the village, the population was spread out, with 27.7% under the age of 18, 5.6% from 18 to 24, 29.4% from 25 to 44, 28.3% from 45 to 64, and 8.9% who were 65 years of age or older. The median age was 39 years. For every 100 females, there were 98.8 males. For every 100 females age 18 and over, there were 104.6 males.

The median income for a household in the village was $56,083, and the median income for a family was $58,056. Males had a median income of $43,958 versus $27,344 for females. The per capita income for the village was $23,141. About 3.5% of families and 5.1% of the population were below the poverty line, including 7.4% of those under age 18 and 2.2% of those age 65 or over.

References

Villages in Macon County, Illinois
Villages in Illinois